The 1947 European Figure Skating Championships were held in Davos, Switzerland from January 31 to February 2. Elite senior-level figure skaters from European ISU member nations, in addition to the United States, Canada, and Australia, competed for the title of European Champion in the disciplines of men's singles, ladies' singles, and pair skating. Athlets from Germany and Austria were not admitted. Austrian skaters Eva Pawlik and Edi Rada probably would have won medals.

Results

Men

Ladies
Scott is the only winner from outside Europe in ladies' singles.

Pairs

References

External links
 

European Figure Skating Championships, 1947
European Figure Skating Championships, 1947
European Figure Skating Championships
International figure skating competitions hosted by Switzerland
Sport in Davos
February 1947 sports events in Europe